Southerham Farm is a   nature reserve on the eastern outskirts of Lewes  in East Sussex. It is managed by the Sussex Wildlife Trust.

The thin and infertile soils on this chalk site result in a floristically very rich grassland. Plants which flower in the summer include horseshoe vetch, kidney vetch, mouse-ear hawkweed, field scabious, dropwort and salad burnet.

References

Sussex Wildlife Trust
Glynde